Criticism of the Bible is an interdisciplinary field of study concerning the factual accuracy of the claims and the moral tenability of the commandments made in the Bible, the holy book of Christianity. Devout Christians have long regarded their Bible as the perfect word of God (and devout Jews have held the Hebrew Bible similarly in high regard). Scholars and scientists have endeavored for centuries to scrutinise biblical texts to establish their origins (a related field of study known as biblical criticism) and validity. In addition to concerns about ethics in the Bible, about biblical inerrancy, or about the historicity of the Bible, there remain some questions of biblical authorship and as to what material to include in the biblical canon.

Authorship

At the end of the 17th century, only a few Bible scholars doubted that Moses wrote the Torah (also known as the Pentateuch, traditionally called the "Five Books of Moses"), such as Thomas Hobbes, Isaac La Peyrère and Baruch Spinoza, but in the late 18th century some scholars such as Jean Astruc (1753) began to systematically question his authorship. By the end of the 19th century, some such as Julius Wellhausen and Abraham Kuenen went as far as to claim that as a whole the work was of many more authors over many centuries from 1000 BC (the time of David) to 500 BC (the time of Ezra) and that the history it contained was often more polemical rather than strictly factual. By the first half of the 20th century, Hermann Gunkel had drawn attention to mythic aspects, and Albrecht Alt, Martin Noth, and the tradition history school argued that although its core traditions had genuinely ancient roots, the narratives were fictional framing devices and were not intended as history in the modern sense.

The modern consensus amongst Bible scholars is that the vast majority of the authors of books of the Bible are unknown. Most of them are written anonymously, and only some of the 27 books of the New Testament mention an author, some of which are probably or known to be pseudepigrapha, meaning they were written by someone other than whom the author said he was. The anonymous books have traditionally been attributed authors, though none of these, such as the "Five Books of Moses", or the four canonical gospels "according to Matthew, Mark, Luke, and John" have appeared to stand up under scrutiny. Only the 7 undisputed Pauline epistles appear to have most likely been written by Paul the Apostle, the Book of Revelation by John of Patmos (not by John the Apostle, nor by the author(s) of the other 'Johannine literature'). Scholars disagree whether Paul wrote the "Deutero-Pauline epistles" and whether Simon Peter wrote First Epistle of Peter; all other New Testament books that mention an author are most likely forgeries. Though, for the Pastorals, this can be a result of mainly a passing down the tradition of "scholarly consensus" vs. merited by the evidence.

In the 2nd century, the gnostics often claimed that their form of Christianity was the first, and they regarded Jesus as a teacher or an allegorical figure. Elaine Pagels has proposed that there are several examples of gnostic attitudes in the Pauline epistles. Bart D. Ehrman and Raymond E. Brown note that some of the Pauline epistles are widely regarded by scholars as pseudonymous, and it is the view of Timothy Freke, and others, that this involved a forgery in an attempt by the Church to bring in Paul's gnostic supporters and turn the arguments in the other epistles on their head.

Canonicity

Specific collections of biblical writings, such as the Hebrew Bible and Christian Bibles, are considered sacred and authoritative by their respective faith groups. The limits of the canon were effectively set by the proto-orthodox churches from the 1st throughout the 4th century; however, the status of the scriptures has been a topic of scholarly discussion in the later churches. Increasingly, the biblical works have been subjected to literary and historical criticism in an effort to interpret the biblical texts, independent of churches and dogmatic influences.

In the middle of the second century, Marcion of Sinope proposed rejecting the entire Jewish Bible. He considered the God portrayed therein to be a lesser deity, a demiurge, and that the law of Moses was contrived.

Religious Jews discount the New Testament and Old Testament deuterocanonicals. They, along with most Christians, also discredit the legitimacy of New Testament apocrypha, and a view sometimes referred to as Jesuism does not affirm the scriptural authority of any biblical text other than the teachings of Jesus in the Gospels.

Ethics 

Elizabeth Anderson, a professor of philosophy and women's studies at the University of Michigan, Ann Arbor, states that "the Bible contains both good and evil teachings", and it is "morally inconsistent".

Anderson criticizes commands God gave to men in the Old Testament, such as: kill adulterers, homosexuals, and "people who work on the Sabbath" (Leviticus 20:10; Leviticus 20:13; Exodus 35:2, respectively); to commit ethnic cleansing (Exodus 34:11–14, Leviticus 26:7–9); commit genocide (Numbers 21: 2–3, Numbers 21:33–35, Deuteronomy 2:26–35, and Joshua 1–12); and other mass killings. Anderson considers the Bible to permit slavery, the beating of slaves, the rape of female captives in wartime, polygamy (for men), the killing of prisoners, and child sacrifice. She also provides several examples to illustrate what she considers "God's moral character": "Routinely punishes people for the sins of others ... punishes all mothers by condemning them to painful childbirth", punishes four generations of descendants of those who worship other gods, kills 24,000 Israelites because some of them sinned (Numbers 25:1–9), kills 70,000 Israelites for the sin of David in 2 Samuel 24:10–15, and "sends two bears out of the woods to tear forty-two children to pieces" because they called someone names in 2 Kings 2:23–24.

Anderson criticizes what she terms morally repugnant lessons of the New Testament. She claims that "Jesus tells us his mission is to make family members hate one another, so that they shall love him more than their kin" (Matt 10:35–37), that "Disciples must hate their parents, siblings, wives, and children (Luke 14:26)", and that Peter and Paul elevate men over their wives "who must obey their husbands as gods" (1 Corinthians 11:3, 14:34–35, Eph. 5:22–24, Col. 3:18, 1 Tim. 2: 11–12, 1 Pet. 3:1). Anderson states that the Gospel of John implies that "infants and anyone who never had the opportunity to hear about Christ are damned [to hell], through no fault of their own".

Simon Blackburn states that the "Bible can be read as giving us a carte blanche for harsh attitudes to children, the mentally handicapped, animals, the environment, the divorced, unbelievers, people with various sexual habits, and elderly women".

Blackburn criticizes what he terms morally suspect themes of the New Testament. He notes some "moral quirks" of Jesus: that he could be "sectarian" (Matt 10:5–6), racist (Matt 15:26 and Mark 7:27), and placed no value on animal life (Luke 8: 27–33).

Blackburn provides examples of Old Testament moral criticisms, such as the phrase in Exodus 22:18, ("Thou shalt not suffer a witch to live.") which he says has "helped to burn alive tens or hundreds of thousands of women in Europe and America". He states that the Old Testament God apparently has "no problems with a slave-owning society", considers birth control a crime punishable by death, and "is keen on child abuse". Additional examples that are questioned today are the prohibition on touching women during their "period of menstrual uncleanliness (Lev. 15:19–24)", the apparent approval of selling daughters into slavery (Exodus 21:7), and the obligation to put to death someone working on the Sabbath (Exodus 35:2).

Historicity

The historicity of the Bible is the question of the Bible's "acceptability as a history". This can be extended to the question of the Christian New Testament as an accurate record of the historical Jesus and the Apostolic Age.

Scholars examine the historical context of the Bible passages, the importance ascribed to events by the authors, and the contrast between the descriptions of these events and other historical evidence.

Archaeological discoveries since the 19th century are open to interpretation, but broadly speaking they lend support to few of the Old Testament's narratives as history and offer evidence to challenge others.{{efn|1="Biblical archaeology has helped us understand a lot about the world of the Bible and clarified a considerable amount of what we find in the Bible. But the archaeological record has not been friendly for one vital issue, Israel's origins: the period of slavery in Egypt, the mass departure of Israelite slaves from Egypt, and the violent conquest of the land of Canaan by the Israelites. The strong consensus is that there is at best sparse indirect evidence for these biblical episodes, and for the conquest there is considerable evidence against it.", Peter Enns However, some scholars still hold that the overall Old Testament narrative is historically reliable.

Biblical minimalism is a label applied to a loosely knit group of scholars who hold that the Bible's version of history is not supported by any archaeological evidence so far unearthed, thus the Bible cannot be trusted as a history source. Author Richard I. Pervo details the non-historical sources of the Book of Acts.

Historicity of Jesus 

The validity of the Gospels is challenged by writers such as Kersey Graves who claimed that mythic stories, that have parallels in the life of Jesus, support the conclusion that the gospel writers incorporated them into the story of Jesus and Gerald Massey, who specifically claimed that the life story of the Egyptian god Horus was copied by Christian Gnostics. Parallels have also been drawn between Greek myths and the life of Jesus. The comparative mythology of Jesus Christ examines the parallels that have been proposed for the Biblical portrayal of Jesus in comparison to other religious or mythical domains. Some critics have alleged that Christianity is not founded on a historical figure, but rather on a mythical creation. One of these views proposes that Jesus was the Jewish manifestation of a pan-Hellenic cult, known as Osiris-Dionysus.

Christ myth theory proponents claim that the age, authorship, and authenticity of the Gospels can not be verified, thus the Gospels can not bear witness to the historicity of Jesus. This is in contrast with writers such as David Strauss, who regarded only the supernatural elements of the gospels as myth, but whereas these supernatural myths were a point of contention, there was no refutation of the gospels' authenticity as a witness to the historicity of Jesus.

Critics of the Gospels such as Richard Dawkins and Thomas Henry Huxley note that they were written long after the death of Jesus and that we have no real knowledge of the date of composition of the Gospels. Annie Besant and Thomas Paine note that the authors of the Gospels are not known.

Internal consistency 

There are many places in the Bible in which inconsistencies—such as different numbers and names for the same feature, and different sequences for the same events—have been alleged and presented by critics as difficulties. Responses to these criticisms include the modern documentary hypothesis, the two-source hypothesis, and theories that the pastoral epistles are pseudonymous.

However, authors such as Raymond Brown have presented arguments that the Gospels contradict each other in various important respects and on various important details. W. D. Davies and E. P. Sanders state that: "on many points, especially about Jesus' early life, the evangelists were ignorant ... they simply did not know, and, guided by rumour, hope or supposition, did the best they could". Yet, E.P. Sanders has also opined, "The dominant view today seems to be that we can know pretty well what Jesus was out to accomplish, that we can know a lot about what he said, and that those two things make sense within the world of first-century Judaism." More critical scholars see the nativity stories either as completely fictional accounts, or at least constructed from traditions that predate the Gospels.

For example, many versions of the Bible specifically point out that the most reliable early manuscripts and other ancient witnesses did not include , i.e., the Gospel of Mark originally ended at Mark 16:8, and additional verses were added a few hundred years later. This is known as the "Markan Appendix".

Translation issues 

Translation of scripture into the vernacular (such as English and hundreds of other languages), though a common phenomenon, is also a subject of debate and criticism. For readability, clarity, or other reasons, translators may choose different wording or sentence structure, and some translations may choose to paraphrase passages. Because many of the words in the original language have ambiguous or difficult to translate meanings, debates over correct interpretation occur. For instance, at creation, is רוח אלהים (ruach 'elohiym) the "wind of god", "spirit of god"(i.e., the Holy Spirit in Christianity), or a "mighty wind" over the primordial deep? In Hebrew, רוח (ruach) can mean "wind", "breath" or "spirit". Both ancient and modern translators are divided over this and many other such ambiguities. Another example is the word used in the Masoretic Text  to indicate the woman who would bear Immanuel is alleged to mean a young, unmarried woman in Hebrew, while  follows the Septuagint version of the passage that uses the Greek word parthenos, translated virgin, and is used to support the Christian idea of virgin birth. Those who view the Masoretic Text, which forms the basis of most English translations of the Old Testament, as being more accurate than the Septuagint, and trust its usual translation, may see this as an inconsistency, whereas those who take the Septuagint to be accurate may not.

More recently, several discoveries of ancient manuscripts such as the Dead Sea Scrolls, and Codex Sinaiticus, have led to modern translations like the New International Version differing somewhat from the older ones such as the 17th century King James Version, removing verses not present in the earliest manuscripts (see List of omitted Bible verses), some of which are acknowledged as interpolations, such as the Comma Johanneum, others having several highly variant versions in very important places, such as the resurrection scene in Mark 16. The King-James-Only Movement rejects these changes and upholds the King James Version as the most accurate.

In a 1973 Journal of Biblical Literature article, Philip B. Harner, Professor Emeritus of Religion at Heidelberg College, claimed that the traditional translation of John 1:1c (“and the Word was God” and one of the most frequently cited verses to support the doctrine of the Trinity) is incorrect. He endorses the New English Bible translation of John 1:1c, “and what God was, the Word was.”

The Bible and science 

Common points of criticism against the Bible are targeted at the Genesis creation narrative, Genesis flood myth, and the Tower of Babel. According to young Earth creationism, flat earth theory, and geocentrism, which all take a literal view of the book of Genesis, the universe and all forms of life on Earth were created directly by God roughly 6,000 years ago, a global flood killed almost all life on Earth, and the diversity of languages originated from God confusing his people, who were in the process of constructing a large tower. These assertions, however, are contradicted by contemporary research in disciplines, such as archaeology, anthropology, astronomy, biology, chemistry, geoscience, and physics. For instance, cosmological evidence suggests that the universe is approximately 13.8 billion years old. Analyses of the geological time scale date the Earth to be 4.5 billion years old. Developments in astronomy show the Solar System formed in a protoplanetary disk roughly 4.6 billion years ago. Physics and cosmology show that the Universe expanded, at a rapid rate, from quantum fluctuations in a process known as the Big Bang. Research within biology, chemistry, physics, astronomy, and geology has provided sufficient evidence to show life originated over 4 billion years ago through chemical processes. Countless fossils present throughout the fossil record, as well as research in molecular biology, genetics, anatomy, physiology, zoology, and other life sciences show all living organisms evolved over billions of years and share a common ancestry. Archaeological excavations have expanded human history, with material evidence of ancient cultures older than 6,000 years old. Moreover, 10,000 years is not enough time to account for the current amount of genetic variation in humans. If all humans were descended from two individuals that lived less than 10,000 years ago, it would require an impossibly high rate of mutation to reach humanity's current level of genetic diversity.

Evolutionary creation, the religious belief that God created the world through the processes of evolution, seeks to reconcile some of these scientific challenges with the Christian faith.

According to one of the world's leading biblical archaeologists, William G. Dever,
Archaeology certainly doesn't prove literal readings of the Bible...It calls them into question, and that's what bothers some people. Most people really think that archaeology is out there to prove the Bible. No archaeologist thinks so. ... From the beginnings of what we call biblical archeology, perhaps 150 years ago, scholars, mostly western scholars, have attempted to use archeological data to prove the Bible. And for a long time it was thought to work. William Albright, the great father of our discipline, often spoke of the "archeological revolution." Well, the revolution has come but not in the way that Albright thought. The truth of the matter today is that archeology raises more questions about the historicity of the Hebrew Bible and even the New Testament than it provides answers, and that's very disturbing to some people. 

Dever also wrote:

According to Dever, the scholarly consensus is that the figure of Moses is legendary, and not historical. However, he states that a "Moses-like figure" may have existed somewhere in the southern Transjordan in the mid-13th century BC.

Tel Aviv University archaeologist Ze'ev Herzog wrote in the Haaretz newspaper:

Israel Finkelstein told The Jerusalem Post that Jewish archaeologists have found no historical or archaeological evidence to back the biblical narrative of the Exodus, the Jews' wandering in Sinai or Joshua's conquest of Canaan. On the alleged Temple of Solomon, Finkelstein said that there is no archaeological evidence to prove it really existed. Professor Yoni Mizrahi, an independent archaeologist who has worked with the International Atomic Energy Agency, agreed with Finkelstein.

Regarding the Exodus of Israelites from Egypt, Egyptian archaeologist Zahi Hawass said:

Notable critics
 Richard Dawkins
 Matt Dillahunty
 Albert Einstein
 Sam Harris
 Christopher Hitchens
 Robert G. Ingersoll
 Thomas Jefferson
 Thomas Paine
 Bertrand Russell
 Mark Twain
 Voltaire

See also 
 Antisemitism in Christianity
 Bible conspiracy theory
 Biblical criticism
 Bibliolatry
 Christian terrorism
 Christian views on slavery
 Christianity and violence
 Christianity and domestic violence
 Criticism of Christianity
 Criticism of Jesus
 Criticism of the Book of Mormon
 Criticism of the Quran
 Criticism of the Talmud
 Historical criticism (higher criticism)
 Misquoting Jesus
 Tahrif
 The Bible and violence
 Women in Christianity

Notes

References

Sources

Further reading
 The Encyclopedia of Biblical Errancy, by C. Dennis McKinsey (Prometheus Books 1995)
 The Historical Evidence for Jesus, by G. A. Wells (Prometheus Books 1988)
 The Bible Unearthed, by I. Finkelstein and N. Asherman (Touchstone 2001)
 David and Solomon, by I. Finkelstein and N. Asherman (Freepress 2006)
 The Jesus Puzzle, by Earl Doherty (Age of Reason Publications 1999)
 Not the Impossible Faith, by R. Carrier (Lulu 2009)
 BC The Archaeology of the Bible Lands, by Magnus Magnusson (Bodley Head 1977)
 Godless: How an Evangelical Preacher Became One of America's Leading Atheists, by Dan Barker (Ulysses Press 2008)
 Why I became an Atheist, by John W. Loftus (Prometheus books 2008)
 The Greatest Show on Earth: The Evidence for Evolution, by Richard Dawkins (Blackswan 2007)
 101 Myths of the Bible by Gary Greenberg (Sourcebooks 2000)
 Secret Origins of the Bible by Tim Callahan (Millennium Press 2002)
 The Origins of Biblical Monotheism by Mark S. Smith (Oxford University Press 2001)

External links 

 Bible Research —The Gender-Neutral Bible Controversy
 Introduction to the Bible and Biblical Problems, Internet Infidels website